Liaoningdaxue is a station on Line 2 of the Shenyang Metro. The station opened on 8 April 2018.

Station Layout

References 

Railway stations in China opened in 2018
Shenyang Metro stations